Njësiti guerril is a 1967 Albanian psychological thriller film directed by Dhimiter Anagnosti. The film starred Saimir Kumbaro and Ndrek Luca.

Plot

A psychological battle with doubts and paranoia between three men trying to escape communist-controlled Albania.

Cast
Rikard Ljarja
Ndrek Luca
Reshat Arbana
Bujar Kapexhiu

External links
 

1967 films
1960s war drama films
1960s psychological thriller films
Albanian-language films
Albanian black-and-white films
Albanian drama films
1967 drama films